Dolls Don't Cry is a Canadian animated short film, directed by Frédérick Tremblay and released in 2017. Using stop-motion animation, the film is a portrait of two artists, a man and a woman, who are painstakingly making a stop-motion animated film, before revealing at its climax that they too are characters in a stop-motion animated film being posed and manipulated by another previously unseen animator.

The film won the Grand Jury Prize for Best Canadian Short Film at the 2017 Quebec City Film Festival, and the Prix Iris for Best Animated Short Film at the 20th Quebec Cinema Awards in 2018.

References

External links

2017 films
2017 animated films
2017 short films
Canadian animated short films
2010s Canadian films
Best Animated Short Film Jutra and Iris Award winners